The Breed of Horses Act 1535 and the Horses Act 1540 were Acts of the Parliament of England, which aimed to improve the national stock of horses through breeding. The Acts were repealed by the Statute Law Revision Act 1863.

The Acts
The Breed of Horses Act 1535 (27 Hen. VIII, c. 6) mentions a marked decay in the quality of the breed, the cause it is claimed that "in most places of this Realme little horsis and naggis of small stature and valeu be suffered to depasture and also to covour marys and felys of very small stature". The statute thus required each owner of enclosed deer-parks to possess a minimum of two mares whose height was to be above thirteen hands high in order for them to be bred with horses of no shorter than fourteen hands high.

The Horses Act 1540 (32 Hen. VIII, c.13) ordered that no stallion under 15 hands (60 inches, 152 cm) and no mare under 13 hands (52 inches, 132 cm) was permitted to run out on common land, or to run wild, and no two-year-old colt under 11.2 hands (46 inches, 117 cm) was allowed to run out in any area with mares. Annual round-ups of the commons were enforced, and any stallion under the height limit was ordered to be destroyed, along with "all unlikely tits whether mares or foals."

Legacy 
The requirement for swingeing culls of "under-height" horses was partially repealed by a statute of Elizabeth I in 1566 (8 Elizabeth I, c.8) on the basis that the poor lands could not support the weight of the horses desired by Henry VIII because of "their rottenness ... they are not able to breed beare and bring forth such great breeds of stoned horses as by the statute of 32 Henry VIII is expressed, without peril of miring and perishing of them", and thus many ponies of Britain's mountain and moorland pony breeds in their native environments escaped the slaughter.

References

Bibliography

Acts of the Parliament of England (1485–1603)
1535 in law
Equine genetics
1535 in England
Horses in the United Kingdom
Genetics in the United Kingdom
Animal law
Agriculture legislation in the United Kingdom